Alison Folland (born August 10, 1978) is an American actress and filmmaker.

Folland was born in Boston to a travel agent mother and a cardiologist father. She grew up in Wellesley, and attended high school at Buckingham Browne & Nichols, a private school in Cambridge. She was nominated in 1997 for the Independent Spirit Award for Best Female Lead in All Over Me and had supporting roles in films such as To Die For, Good Will Hunting and Boys Don't Cry.

Filmography 
To Die For (1995) - Lydia Mertz
Before and After (1996) - Martha Taverner
All Over Me (1997) - Claude
Good Will Hunting (1997) - M.I.T. Student
Boys Don't Cry (1999) - Kate
Pigeonholed (1999) - Eve
Finding Forrester (2000) - Jeopardy Contestant
Things Behind the Sun (2001) - Lulu
Milwaukee, Minnesota (2003)- Tuey Stites
The Ballad of Pinto Red (2004) - Pinto Pulaski
She Hate Me (2004) - Doris
Stay Until Tomorrow (2004) - Carla
Zerophilia (2005) - Janine
Diggers (2006) - Beth
I'm Not There (2007) - Grace
The Happening (2008) - Woman Reading on Bench with Hair Pin (opening scene)
The Fighter (2010) - Laurie Carroll (Micky Ward's ex)

Television 
Homicide: Life on the Street (1997) - Grace Rivera
Law & Order (1998) - Gina Bowman
CSI: NY (2006) - Stacey Gale

References

External links

1978 births
American film actresses
American television actresses
Living people
Actresses from Boston
Buckingham Browne & Nichols School alumni
21st-century American women